Dresden Township is a township in Decatur County, Kansas, USA.  As of the 2000 census, its population was 141.

Geography

The stream of North Fork Prairie Dog Creek runs through this township.

References
 USGS Geographic Names Information System (GNIS)

External links
 US-Counties.com
 City-Data.com

Townships in Decatur County, Kansas
Townships in Kansas